The Luxembourg men's national tennis team represents Luxembourg in Davis Cup tennis competition and are governed by the Luxembourg Tennis Federation.

Luxembourg will compete in World Group II in 2023 against South Africa.  They have reached the final round of Group I on four occasions.

History
Luxembourg competed in its first Davis Cup in 1947, losing its first 17 matches until beating Turkey in 1965.

Current team (2023) 

 Alex Knaff (14)
 Chris Rodesch (13)
 Raphael Calzi (8)
 Gilles Kremer (30)
 Noe Plique (NC)
Numbers indicate number of ties played.

Captain 
 Ernest Betzen (1989-1989)
 Pavel Korda (1989-1989)
 Ladislav Tyra (1990-1993)
 Adrien Graimprey (1993-1993)
 Laurent Marty (1995-1999)
 Johny Goudenbour (2001-2007)
 Jacques Radoux (2008-2013)
 Johny Goudenbour (2014-2018)
 Gilles Müller (2019-current)

See also
Davis Cup
Luxembourg Fed Cup team

External links

Davis Cup teams
Davis Cup
Davis Cup